Rhyzodiastes is a genus of beetles in the family Carabidae, containing the following species:

References

 
Rhysodinae
Carabidae genera
Taxa named by Léon Fairmaire